"The Wee German Lairdie" is a Scottish folk song probably ridiculing George I, King of Great Britain to the discontent of the Jacobite rebels, who instead recognised James Francis Edward Stuart as king, from the formerly ruling House of Stuart. Though taking place around 1715, the song first appears in writing in 1810, in Robert Cromek and Allan Cunningham's Remains of Nithsdale and Galloway Song, recalling a song of several versions that was allegedly sung prior. James Hogg, however, mentions "an older collection" in the first volume of his 1819 compilation The Jacobite Relics of Scotland.

According to the The Jacobite Relics, the song was "sung to many different tunes in different districts of the kingdom". Hogg claimed that the most popular tune at the time was the one written by him, but printed alongside it an older tune which he described as "more in character".

Background

The Jacobites had been present in Britain and Ireland since the deposition of James VII & II of Stuart for William III & II of Orange-Nassau, the former being a convert to Catholicism, to the antipathy of ardent protestants in English parliament. Along with Catholics all across the realm, the cause for a continued Stuart monarchy became particularly popular in Scotland, from whence that house originated. Recovering from an infamous massacre of dissenters, defeats in battle, and laws put in place to restrict Catholicism in the kingdoms and from the crown, the Jacobite standard was raised once again in 1714 on the ascension of George I to the British and Irish thrones.

The elector of Hanover, George I came from the Holy Roman Empire to a new land of which he was now king, alleged to have spoken only a minimal amount of English. The song suggests he was an avid gardener, something that isn't commonly (if at all) attested of him in surviving literature.

The notion of the song ridiculing George I in particular comes from its mid-19th century publications and commentary thereof. Though unlikely, the time between the death of George I in 1727 and the song's first verified written appearance in 1810 suggest the possibility of it actually being about said king's son and successor, George II, involved in the Jacobite Rising of 1745.

Lyrics
The following Scots original is the song as it appears in James Hogg's Jacobite Relics of Scotland.

Recordings
 Ewan MacColl – Popular Scottish Songs, 1961
 Nigel Denver – Rebellion!, 1967
 Alastair McDonald – Scottish Battle Ballads, 1973
 Five Hand Reel – Five Hand Reel, 1976
 Jean Redpath – The Songs of Robert Burns, Volumes 5 & 6, 1985
 Old Blind Dogs – New Tricks, 1992

Notes

References 

Jacobite songs
Scottish folk songs
18th-century songs